The Arab Women's Basketball Championship or simply AWBC is a regional basketball tournament which takes place every two years between women's national teams of the members of the Arab Basketball Confederation, representing the Arab world. The first edition was held in 1983 in Jordan.

Statistics

Winners

Titles by team

* hosts.

See also
Arab Women's U18 Basketball Championship

References

External links
سجل البطولات العربية للمنتخبات سيدات ABC official website (in Arabic)

Basketball
Basketball competitions in Africa between national teams
Basketball competitions in Asia between national teams
Women's basketball competitions between national teams